An insult is an expression or statement (or sometimes behavior) which is disrespectful or scornful. Insults may be intentional or accidental. An insult may be factual, but at the same time pejorative, such as the word "inbred".

Jocular exchange

Lacan considered insults a primary form of social interaction, central to the imaginary order – "a situation that is symbolized in the 'Yah-boo, so are you' of the transitivist quarrel, the original form of aggressive communication".

Erving Goffman points out that every "crack or remark set up the possibility of a counter-riposte, topper, or squelch, that is, a comeback". He cites the example of possible interchanges at a dance in a school gym:

Backhanded compliments 

A backhanded (or left-handed) compliment, or asteism, is an insult that is disguised as, or accompanied by, a compliment, especially in situations where the belittling or condescension is intentional.

Examples of backhanded compliments include, but are not limited to:

"I did not expect you to ace that exam. Good for you.", which could impugn the target's success as a fluke.
"That skirt makes you look far thinner.", insinuating hidden fat, with the implication that fat is something to be ashamed of.
"I wish I could be as straightforward as you, but I always try to get along with everyone.", insinuating an overbearing attitude.
"I like you. You have the boldness of a much younger person.", insinuating decline with age.

Negging is a type of backhanded compliment used for emotional manipulation or as a seduction method. The term was coined and prescribed by pickup artists. Negging is often viewed as a straightforward insult rather than as a pick-up line, in spite of the fact that proponents of the technique traditionally stress it is not an insult.

Personal attacks

A personal attack is an insult which is directed at some attribute of the person. 

The Federal Communications Commission's personal attack rule defined a personal attack as one made upon the honesty, character, integrity, or like personal qualities in the Communications Act of 1934.

Personal attacks are generally considered a fallacy when used in arguments since they do not attempt to debunk the opposing sides argument, rather attacking the qualities of a person.

Sexuality

Verbal insults often take a phallic or pudendal form; this includes offensive profanity, and may also include insults to one's sexuality. There are also insults pertaining to the extent of one's sexual activity. For example, according to James Bloodworth, "incel" “has gradually crept into the vocabulary of every internet troll, sometimes being used against men who blame and harass women for not wanting to sleep with them.”

Entertainment
Insults in poetic form is practiced through out history, more often as entertainment rather then maliciousness. Flyting is a contest consisting of the exchange of insults between two parties, often conducted in verse and became public entertainment in Scotland in the 15th and 16th centuries. Senna is a form of Old Norse Eddic poetry consisting of an exchange of insults between participants.

O du eselhafter Peierl (Oh, you asinine Peierl), composed by Wolfgang Amadeus Mozart, was meant for fun, mocking, scatological humor directed at a friend of Mozart's.

More modern versions include poetry slam, dozens, diss song and battle rap.

Anatomies

Various typologies of insults have been proposed over the years. Ethologist Desmond Morris, noting that "almost any action can operate as an Insult Signal if it is performed out of its appropriate context – at the wrong time or in the wrong place", classes such signals in ten "basic categories":
 Uninterest signals
 Boredom signals
 Impatience signals
 Superiority signals
 Deformed-compliment signals
 Mock-discomfort signals
 Rejection signals
 Mockery signals
 Symbolic insults
 Dirt signals

Elizabethans took great interest in such analyses, distinguishing out, for example, the "fleering frump ... when we give a mock with a scornful countenance as in some smiling sort looking aside or by drawing the lip awry, or shrinking up the nose". Shakespeare humorously set up an insult-hierarchy of seven-fold "degrees. The first, the Retort Courteous; the second, the Quip Modest; the third, the Reply Churlish; the fourth, the Reproof Valiant; the fifth, the Countercheck Quarrelsome; the sixth, the Lie with Circumstance; the seventh, the Lie Direct".

Perceptions

What qualifies as an insult is also determined both by the individual social situation and by changing social mores. Thus on one hand the insulting "obscene invitations of a man to a strange girl can be the spicy endearments of a husband to his wife".

See also

References

Further reading
 Thomas Conley: Toward a rhetoric of insult. University of Chicago Press, 2010, .

External links

 

Abuse
Bullying
Emotions